The 2020 Colorado Senate elections took place on November 3, 2020, with the primary elections held on June 30, 2020. Voters in 18 out of 35 districts of the state Senate elected their representative for a four-year term. It coincided with the state House elections and the biennial United States elections. The Democratic Party retained control of the Senate winning 20 seats and increased their majority by one, gaining the 27th district from the Republican Party.

Background
In the previous state Senate election (2018), the Democrats claimed control of the chamber from the Republicans, gaining two Republican and one independent (formerly Democratic Senator) seat. That resulted in a 20-seat Democratic majority. Therefore, for Democrats to have lost their absolute majority in the Senate in this election, Republicans and other parties would have needed to gain at least 2 more seats.

Incumbents not seeking re-election

Term-limited incumbents 
One Democratic and three Republican incumbents are term-limited and prohibited from seeking a consecutive third term.
 Owen Hill (R), District 10
 Vicki Marble (R), District 23
 Nancy Todd (D), District 28
 Larry Crowder (R), District 35

Retiring incumbents 
 Mike Foote (D), District 17
 Jack Tate (R), District 27
 Angela Williams (D), District 33

Predictions

Results 

Districts not shown are not up for election until 2022.

Bold - Gain
Italicize - Hold, new member

Closest races 
Seats where the margin of victory was under 10%:

Detailed results

District 4

District 8

District 10

District 12

District 14

District 17

District 18

District 19

District 21

District 23

District 25

District 26

District 27

District 28

District 29

District 31

District 33

District 35

References

External links

Senate
Colorado Senate elections
Colorado Senate